is a Japanese video game developer based in Tokyo known for its action, platform, and shoot 'em up games. The company was founded in 1992 by former Konami employees seeking to explore original game concepts and free themselves from Konami's reliance on sequels. Their first game, Gunstar Heroes (1993) on the Sega Genesis, was a critical success and established a creative and action-oriented design style that would continue to characterize their output. Treasure's philosophy in game development has always been to make games they enjoy, not necessarily those that have the greatest commercial viability.

Treasure grew a cult following for their action games developed during the 1990s, and though initially exclusive to Sega platforms, they expanded to other platforms in 1997. The company earned recognition from critics, being called one of the best Japanese indie studios and 2D game developers. The company's output decreased in the 2010s, with their most recent release being Gaist Crusher God in 2014.

History

Origins and 16-bit era 
Treasure founder and president Masato Maegawa dreamed of working in the video game industry when he was young and began learning computer programming in junior high school. He studied programming in college and was hired by developer and publisher Konami after graduating. At Konami, Maegawa and associates that would later establish Treasure worked on a variety of games including arcade titles The Simpsons (1991) and Bucky O'Hare (1992), and Super NES games Super Castlevania IV (1991), Contra III: The Alien Wars (1992), and Axelay (1992). In 1991, Maegawa and several other Konami employees began planning an original game that would become Gunstar Heroes (1993), but their concept was rejected by Konami. Maegawa and his team were growing frustrated with Konami's growing reliance on sequels to established franchises such as their Castlevania and Teenage Mutant Ninja Turtles series. The team felt consumers wanted original games, and so they left Konami in 1992 to establish Treasure and continue development on Gunstar Heroes.

Treasure was founded on June 19, 1992; the company name came from wanting to be a "treasure" to the industry. Around the time of founding, the company had just over ten people. Even though most of the staff made games for the Super NES at Konami, they wanted to develop Gunstar Heroes for the Sega Genesis because the system's Motorola 68000 microprocessor was necessary for the visuals and gameplay they were striving for. Treasure approached Sega for a publishing contract. At first, they were not granted approval because they lacked a track record, but Sega instead contracted them to develop McDonald's Treasure Land Adventure (1993). Several months into development, they were granted approval to work on Gunstar Heroes. Treasure staff was split into two teams to work on both games in parallel. They had a staff of around 18 people at the time, most being ex-Konami programmers. The staff felt they had more freedom working under Sega than Konami.

McDonald's Treasure Land Adventure was completed first, but Treasure decided to finish and release Gunstar Heroes first because they wanted their debut to be an original game. North American magazine GameFan were enthralled with the game and secured the first English language interview with Treasure that year. McDonald's Treasure Land Adventure was released next, initiating a trend for Treasure of developing games based on licensed properties. As a small studio, Treasure required the revenue from licensed games to develop original projects. Treasure continued to develop games for the Genesis for the remainder of the 16-bit era because of the system's smooth sprite movement, and grew a following among Sega fans. After Gunstar Heroes, Treasure was divided into four teams to develop (in order of release): platformer Dynamite Headdy (1994), fighting game Yu Yu Hakusho Makyō Tōitsusen (1994), run and gun Alien Soldier (1995), and action-adventure Light Crusader (1995). The variety among these games illustrated unevenness and unpredictability in Treasure's output that would become characteristic of them.

32-bit era 
In 1994, Sega introduced the Sega Saturn technology to Treasure. Treasure were impressed with the system's ability to handle a large number of sprites. They also knew their fan base consisted entirely of Sega gamers, so as the 32-bit era began, they moved development to the Saturn. Even though the Saturn was capable of 3D graphics, they continued to develop 2D games because they had built up 2D sprite know how. They were not concerned with competing with 3D games. First on Saturn was Guardian Heroes (1996), a beat 'em up that combines elements from fighting games and RPGs. Treasure worked on their next two releases concurrently, side-scrolling platformers Mischief Makers (1997) and Silhouette Mirage (1997). Mischief Makers was released on the Nintendo 64 and published by Enix, Treasure's first game published by a company other than Sega and released on non-Sega hardware. Treasure chose to develop for the Nintendo 64 because they were interested in the hardware's capabilities. Enix had heard of Treasure's reputation for action games and requested to publish for them in the past, but it was not until Treasure was developing for a non-Sega platform that they sought Enix's cooperation. Mischief Makers was followed by Silhouette Mirage, which was initially released on the Saturn then ported to the PlayStation in 1998.

In 1998, Treasure released their first arcade game, the shoot 'em up Radiant Silvergun. Treasure had been hesitant to develop an arcade game for years because of concerns with their commercial viability, but the staff felt Radiant Silvergun had potential and they were eager to develop it. The game was ported to the Saturn later that year. Enix published Treasure's next game for the PlayStation, fighting game Rakugaki Showtime (1999), but had to pull it from shelves shortly after release because of a lawsuit filed against them. This was followed by the multidirectional shooter Bangai-O (1999) which received a limited release on the Nintendo 64, but was later modified and re-released for the Dreamcast. By 1999, most of the founding Treasure staff were still with the company.

2000s 
Treasure began the 2000s with some early troubles. Gun Beat, a racing game they were developing for Sega's NAOMI arcade platform, was canceled with little explanation. Also, Silpheed: The Lost Planet (2000) and Stretch Panic (2001) for the PlayStation 2 were both critically panned. Despite these hiccups, Treasure did find success with Sin and Punishment (2000), a rail shooter co-developed with Nintendo for the Nintendo 64 and later released on the iQue in China. The game was not released in western territories but grew a cult following among import gamers. While Sin and Punishment was still in development, Treasure started development on a spiritual sequel to Radiant Silvergun titled Ikaruga (2001). The arcade shooter was co-developed with G.rev, and ported to the Dreamcast and saw a worldwide release on the GameCube.

Treasure next embarked on a series of licensed projects. Two of these were based on the Tiny Toon Adventures franchise, Tiny Toon Adventures: Buster's Bad Dream (2002) for the Game Boy Advance and the unreleased Tiny Toon Adventures: Defenders of the Universe for the PlayStation 2. Other licensed games during this period included Game Boy Advance games Hajime no Ippo: The Fighting! (2003) and Astro Boy: Omega Factor (2003), as well as GameCube games Wario World (2003) and Dragon Drive: D-Masters Shot (2003). Astro Boy: Omega Factor was co-developed with Hitmaker and was critically praised for returning to Treasure's classic side-scrolling action style that had been missing from their recent output. Their next game was Gradius V (2004) which like Ikaruga before it, was co-developed with G.rev. The companies worked under contract for Konami, and the game helped cement Treasure's return to critical successes following a slew of mediocre licensed games.

Treasure developed sequels on the Game Boy Advance for their earlier successes, Advance Guardian Heroes (2004) and Gunstar Super Heroes (2005). Treasure followed this with a series of licensed Bleach games for the Nintendo DS. Maegawa explained that his company experiences challenges in developing games based on licensed properties like Bleach, saying that the staff wants to be original but cannot detract too far from the source material and risk disappointing fans. By 2009, the company had 20-30 employees.

2010s and 2020s 
The number of employees at Treasure had dropped to 16 by 2011, and to less than 10 by 2022. In a 2011 interview, Maegawa explained that Treasure now uses middleware to develop games, no longer using custom programming to push the hardware to their maximum levels. The company was also putting an increased focus on rereleasing their back catalog as downloadable games on the Virtual Console, PlayStation Network, and Xbox Live. Treasure has not released any new games since 2014 apart from re-releases of games like Ikaruga. On June 19, 2022, its 30th anniversary, Treasure announced it was working on a "highly requested" game.

Staff and design philosophy
Treasure does not have a rigid hierarchy. Maegawa explained that Treasure operates differently from other companies by not assigning lead designers. While a project leader may create a project plan, most of the game design is done collaboratively between the programmers and artists. Most permanent employees and part-time contractors drift in and out of projects as required. Some individuals have been important figures in Treasure's history:

 Masato Maegawa – Founder, company president, and lead producer on all games. He was programmer for some of the company's Genesis games.
 Hideyuki Suganami – Programmer on Gunstar Heroes, Alien Soldier, Mischief Makers, and Sin and Punishment. Suganami has left the company but worked as a freelancer on Gunstar Super Heroes and Sin and Punishment: Star Successor.
 Hiroshi Iuchi – Director for Radiant Silvergun, Ikaruga, and Gradius V
 Mitsuru Yaida – Programmer for the Bangai-O games
 Tetsuhiko Kikuchi – Frequent artist and character designer. Led development of Guardian Heroes.
 Norio Hanzawa – Frequent composer
 Yasushi Suzuki – Artist for Radiant Silvergun, Sin and Punishment, and Ikaruga

Treasure places emphasis on creating original games in the action, platform, and shooter genres. They do not have a preference on gaming platforms or 2D vs. 3D gameplay, preferring to choose the most suitable depending on the game they are designing. The company has never viewed sales as much of a concern. They would prefer making the games they want to make, and not what will more likely sell well. Maegawa has preferred to always keep the company small to keep an "independent-minded" mentality, and help the developers' personalities shine through their games.

They expressed disinterest in sequels early in their history, but became more open to it later. They pride themselves in creating original ideas and avoiding imitating other works or being associated with games already on the market. They have made games based on licensed properties to generate revenue to pursue original projects. Explaining the Treasure design philosophy, Megawa said it "simply, to create the games we want to make" and "creating the things we love in the way we like." The company has generally employed around 20 to 30 people at any given time.

Reputation 
Treasure was one of the most celebrated developers of the 16-bit era and grew a cult following during the period. USgamer called them "one of Japan's pioneering indie developers" and explained the "sense of integrity" in their 1990s work that was not seen in other games of the era. Maximum: The Video Game Magazine called them "one of the most respected programming houses in the world" in 1996. Gamers' Republic agreed in 1998, writing: "Any action or platform gamer worth his salt recognizes Treasure as one of the finest development houses in the world." In 2005, 1UP.com called Treasure "one of Japan's most famous independent development houses [...] releasing some of the most finely crafted, creative, and offbeat action games the world has ever seen." Treasure did not have any large commercial successes, which influenced Retro Gamer to describe their output as "critically acclaimed yet commercially unsuccessful." Because of the loyal fan base but low sales, prices of Treasure games such as Rakugaki Showtime and Radiant Silvergun have climbed on the secondary market.

The company established a signature style early on that became consistent across their work. Their first game, Gunstar Heroes, established what 1UP.com called Treasure's key themes: "creativity, weirdness, and a tendency toward completely absurd levels of action." Wireframe called their style "fast, aggressive [...] featuring bold graphics and surreal dashes of humour." Retro Gamer wrote that they have "consistently excellent art direction" and are renowned for their "action-packed" and "explosive" gameplay.  They explained that Treasure is "at the very cutting edge of artistic freedom, forging its own very particular path and creating a softography guided by nothing other than the whims of the creators." The company is known for taking risks within established genres, borrowing conventional ideas and adding their own creative touches to create something new and innovative. They became recognized for their prowess in 2D game design, with Gamers' Republic calling their output "the finest 2D platform games on the planet." Treasure is also known for technological innovation; several of their games pushed the hardware to their limits.

Games developed

Cancelled games
 Gun Beat (Arcade, cancelled 2000)
 Tiny Toon Adventures: Defenders of the Universe (GameCube & PlayStation 2, cancelled 2002)

Notes

References

External links
  

Video game companies established in 1992
Video game companies of Japan
Amusement companies of Japan
Konami
Video game development companies
Software companies based in Tokyo
Japanese companies established in 1992